The Zürich trolleybus system is part of the public transport network of Zürich, Switzerland.  Opened in 1939, it combines the Zürich S-Bahn, the Zürich tramway network and Zürich's urban motorbus network to form an integrated all-four style scheme.

It is operated by Verkehrsbetriebe Zürich (VBZ), which also operates the tramway and motorbus networks. Like the other modes of public transport in the region, it is covered by the Zürcher Verkehrsverbund.

History
The Zürich trolleybus system was opened on 27 May 1939, by the then Städtische Strassenbahn Zürich ("Zurich Municipal Tramway") (St. St. Z.).  It was the third modern trolleybus system to be opened in Switzerland, after the Lausanne system and Winterthur system, respectively. Initially, trolleybus routes were created on new routings intended to complement, rather than compete with, the city's existing tram network.

De facto, the new system's initial operator was the legally independent transport company Autobusbetrieb der Städtischen Strassenbahn Zürich ("Bus Operation of the Zürich Municipal Tramway"). This company had been founded in 1927 as Kraftwagenbetrieb der Städtischen Strassenbahn Zürich ("Motor Vehicle Operator of the Zürich Municipal Tramway") and had been renamed in 1935. Only in March 1949 did the two companies merge, to form the Verkehrsbetriebe der Stadt Zürich, which, since 1978, has been known as Verkehrsbetriebe Zürich.

The first Zürich trolleybus route was Bezirksgebäude (Limmatplatz) to Bucheggplatz, and is now part of line 32. Between its opening in 1946 and 1956, line C, latterly known as line 34, was isolated from the rest of the system. During that period, vehicle replacement on that line was carried out using a so-called Bügelwagen ("current collector") on tram tracks.

In the 1950s, the city's trams began to be seen as inflexible and susceptible to the growing traffic congestion in the city streets. One proposed solution was the conversion of the less busy lines to trolleybus routes, and the first step in this direction was the conversion, between 1954 and 1958, of tram route 1, and an outer portion of tram route 2, into trolleybus route 31. However no further conversions of tram routes to trolleybuses have taken place.

With the introduction of the 2014 timetable, routes 33 and 72 swapped their south-western termini, with the 33 running from Bahnhof Tiefenbrunnen to Triemli and the 72 running from Milchbuck to Morgental.

Line 83 (Milchbuck – Altstetten) was converted from a bus route in 2015. The section from Milchbuck to Hardplatz uses overhead power; from Hardplatz to Altstetten, the trolleybuses run on battery.

In August 2017, trolleybus route 31 was permanently cut back from Schlieren to Altstetten (Farbhof), in preparation for the construction of the Limmattal light rail line. Once the first phase of this new line is completed, tram route 2 will be extended over it from Farbhof to Schlieren, thus reinstating it to its full length prior to the introduction of route 31. With the introduction of the 2018 timetable, route 31 was extended at its opposite end to take over the full length of trolleybus route 34, which was discontinued, thus providing a direct link between the city centre and Witikon.

Lines 
The present system is made up of the following six lines:

Lines 31, 32, 33, 72 and 83 are cross-city routes, while line 46 is a radial route. All trolleybus lines have an identifying colour.

A special feature of the system is the overhead wire crossing at Friesenberg railway station, where line 32, energised at 600 V DC, crosses the Uetlibergbahn, which has a 1,200 V DC catenary. By contrast, the proposed electrification of motorbus line 62 did not proceed, because it would have had to cross an electrified SBB-CFF-FFS railway line. An overhead wire crossing at that point, Affoltern, was not approved on safety grounds, due to the high 15 kV AC voltage of the railway line.

To this day, the trolleybus overhead wire network is closely connected to the tramway network: for example, only two rectifier stations are devoted exclusively to the trolleybus system. In some places, the return line to the rectifier is via tramway rails. Within the boundaries of the central workshop in Altstetten, there is a special trolleybus test line. This circular route is not connected to the rest of the trolleybus network.

The line 83 runs in battery-mode from Hardplatz to Bhf. Altstetten. The lines 33 und 72 run in battery-mode from Hardplatz to Albisriederplatz. The line 32 rund in battery-mode from Bucheggplatz to Lägernstr.

Fleet

Retired fleet 

Initially, a fleet of six rigid trolleybuses was available for use on the Zurich system.  They were made by Saurer, Tüscher, FBW and SWS, carried fleet nos. 51 to 56, and differed technically or structurally from each other.  By 1957, the number of rigid vehicles of various types in the fleet had increased to 57 units.

In 1957, the VBZ received its first articulated trolleybus prototype, fleet no. 101, manufactured by FBW. The VBZ's subsequent procurement of series production FBW vehicles between 1959 and 1964 included fleet nos. 102 to 133. Its second series of articulated vehicles, delivered in 1974/1975, consisted of fleet numbers 70–100, and was also manufactured by FBW.

A portion of the articulated fleet, nos. 73, 105, 107, 109, 111, 129 and 132, were sent to Chile in 1991 and 1992, after their retirement from the Zürich system. There, some of them remained in operation for more than 20 years on the Valparaíso trolleybus system. Of those articulated vehicles, the former Zürich no. 105, built in 1959, was the world's oldest articulated trolleybus of any make in regular passenger service anywhere in the world from 1997 until its retirement in May 2015.

The articulated vehicles from the 1950s were replaced about 40 years later by the first series of the Mercedes-Benz O405 GTZ. These included the prototype, fleet no. 1 (built 1986), and the series production vehicles nos. 2 to 36 (model years 1988 to 1989), all of which have since been retired and replaced by Hess low-floor vehicles.

The dual-mode bus of type O405 GNTD, fleet no. 51, was a unique vehicle. The first low-floor trolleybus to operate in Zürich, it was tested on the system between October 1997 and March 1999.

Current fleet 

, the Zurich trolleybus fleet stood at 114 vehicles, of which 83 were articulated and 31 bi-articulated:

The bi-articulated vehicles cover all of the vehicle runs (or duties) on line 31, as well as individual runs on line 32. If, due to construction activities, these trolleybuses vehicles cannot be used on line 31, they can operate additional runs on line 32.

In preparation for the introduction of the bi-articulated vehicles, some of the bus stops on these two lines had to be converted, as the bi-articulated vehicles are about  longer than a conventional articulated bus. Earlier, at the start of 2006, there had been extensive test runs using a bi-articulated vehicles from the Geneva trolleybus system.

The first conventional Swisstrolley, no. 144, was delivered on 20 July 2006 as a pre-series production vehicle, and presented to the public.  Since September 2006, it has been in regular service.

For 2012, the Verkehrsbetriebe Zürich plans to replace all remaining high-floor vehicles with an additional 21 articulated Swisstrolley 3 and 17 bi-articulated Hess lighTrams. With the introduction of the latter group of vehicles, line 32 will be fully converted to bi-articulated vehicle operation. The associated increase in the system's capacity, combined with a thinning of service frequencies, should enable the reduction of the fleet by five units.

The last four O405 GTZ trolleybuses, which were the last high-floor trolleybuses in the fleet, were retired in December 2015.

Future developments
The Limmattal light rail line is currently under construction to the west of Zürich, and when completed it will follow the same route as the current outer section of trolleybus route 31 between Farbhof and Schlieren. When this happens, the 31 will be cut back to Micafil, one stop west of Farbhof. It will be replaced by an extension of tram route 2 from Farbhof to Schlieren over the tracks of the Limmattal line.

Work is underway to make bus routes 69 (Milchbuck – ETH Hönggerberg) and 80 (Triemlispital – Bahnhof Oerlikon) electrified by 2024 and 2025, respectively.

The route 83 may be extended to Unterenstringen and the Bus route 89 may be electrified.

See also

List of trolleybus systems in Switzerland
Trams in Zürich

References

Footnotes

Citations

Further reading

External links

Trolleybus city: Zürich (Switzerland) Trolleymotion.
 
 

Transport in Zürich
Zurich
Zurich
1939 establishments in Switzerland